Proxibarbital (Ipronal) is a barbiturate derivative synthesized  in 1956. It has anti-anxiety  properties and is, in contrast to most barbiturates, almost without hypnotic action.

It was also used in the treatment of migraine headaches in a similar manner to butalbital.

Valofane isomerises to Proxibarbal in vivo.

References 

Barbiturates
Antimigraine drugs
Allyl compounds
GABAA receptor positive allosteric modulators